The Philippines competed at the 2007 Summer Universiade also known as the XXIV Summer Universiade, in Bangkok, Thailand.

The delegation composed of 34 athletes competing in four sports and is joined by 11 officials. Their participation is sanctioned by the University Athletic Association of the Philippines (UAAP). This is the last time that the UAAP sanctioned athletes competing for the country in the Universiade after the Federation of School Sports Association of the Philippines was granted membership by the International University Sports Federation (FISU).

Competitors

Source: GMA News

Medalists

References

Summer Universiade
Nations at the 2007 Summer Universiade
Philippines at the Summer Universiade